Narragansett Park was an American race track for Thoroughbred horse racing in Pawtucket, Rhode Island.

Beginnings
On May 18, 1934, Rhode Island voters approved a measure legalizing parimutuel betting by an almost 3 to 1 margin. The following day, the Narragansett Racing Association announced plans for a $1 million race track and steeplechase course on the site of the former What Cheer Airport and filed articles of incorporation with the Secretary of State of Rhode Island. The Association chose to name their track after Narragansett Park, a former trotting park in Cranston, Rhode Island. On June 6, 1934, the Narragansett Racing Association was awarded the state's first horse racing permit. Construction was completed in less than two months at a cost of $1.2 million. The track consisted of a one-mile racing oval, a 14,000 seat grandstand, 270 betting and paying booths, a clubhouse, and 22 barns with stalls that could hold more than 1,000 horses. The City of Pawtucket constructed a new four-lane highway leading to the entrance of the track and a double track railway was built near the stands.

Narragansett Park opened on August 1, 1934, with 37,281 people in attendance, including Jack Dempsey, Cornelius Vanderbilt Whitney, Alfred Gwynne Vanderbilt Jr., and Jesse H. Metcalf. The track's first card consisted of eight races. The feature race was a $5,000 added six furlongs sprint for three-year-olds and up won by Chinese Empress, a three-year-old chestnut filly. The mutuel handle for the day was $351,482. On Labor Day 1934 the track drew 53,922 patrons, the most for any sporting event in the history of Rhode Island.

During its early years, Narragansett Park was one of the most financially successful tracks in the country. From the time it opened to September 30, 1936 it posted a net profit of $2,017,381.54. In 1934 Rhode Island received over $800,000 in revenue from the track, which was more than 10% of the state's entire budget. Narragansett also became known as somewhat of a “High Society” due to its proximity to Newport, Rhode Island – the summer resort of many wealthy owners from New York City. The track was frequented by celebrities, including Cab Calloway, Jimmy Durante, Babe Ruth, Lou Gehrig, Mickey Rooney, and Milton Berle. For decades, the track received patrons from Boston via the New Haven Railroad. During the racing season, daily trains, known as "'Gansett Specials" ran from Boston's South Station to the station tracks at Naragansett Park. The trains left Boston around noon to arrive in time for the first race and returned following the last race.

Narragansett Park was part of many horse racing innovations. The track was one of the first in the country to install a photo finish camera and a starting gate. It was also one of the first to institute a $1,000 minimum purse.

On June 22, 1935, Seabiscuit broke his maiden at Narragansett and equaled the five-furlong track record. Four days later in the Watch Hill Claiming Stakes he once again broke the track record, this time by a full second. In 1937, Seabiscuit finished third in the Narragansett Special. The loss ended a streak of seven consecutive stakes wins for Seabiscuit, one shy of Discovery's record.

The race track war
In the summer of 1937, track president Walter E. O'Hara got into an altercation with the state racing steward. The state Horse Racing Division ordered that O'Hara be removed as a track official of the race track for intimidating and interfering with the steward. The Horse Racing Division also ordered an audit of the Narragansett Racing Association's books, which resulted in six new charges against the track to revoke its license for the fall racing season. O'Hara responded to the charges in his newspaper, the Providence Star-Tribune, in an article which he implied that Governor Robert E. Quinn was or would end up in Butler Hospital, a psychiatric hospital that specialized in the treatment of substance abuse. On September 15, 1937, the Rhode Island Supreme Court unanimously decided to quash the division's order to remove O'Hara. However, Quinn filed two charges with the division seeking O'Hara's removal as a track official and the revocation of the Narragansett Racing Association's license for O'Hara's attacks in the newspaper. The division sided with the Governor and ordered O'Hara's removal and indefinitely suspended the track's license at the end of the summer races. The summer racing season ended on September 30, 1937, however, the track did not remove O'Hara. The Supreme Court quashed the division's order to remove O'Hara and suspend the track's license. However, Quinn refused to permit racing at the track. On October 17, Quinn declared that Narragansett Park was "in a state of insurrection," and ordered the National Guard to enforce martial law. O'Hara, who was in Maryland on business, flew back to the track and was escorted by guardsmen to his penthouse on the track's roof, where he entertained journalists and politicians and played March of the Wooden Soldiers over the public address system for the guardsmen.

On February 9, 1938, sheriff's deputies battered down the Narragansett Racing Association' doors and seized records on order of the Superior Court. O'Hara then resigned as the association's president and managing director. He was succeeded by track secretary James Dooley.

Reopening
The track reopened in 1938 and attracted the same huge crowds it drew before the "war".

On September 19, 1942, the track hosted a match race between Triple Crown winner Whirlaway and 1942 Preakness Stakes winner Alsab. The race was organized after members of the media accused track president James Dooley of concealing the fact that Alsab would not run against Whirlaway in the September 12 Narragansett Special until after a large crowd had come to the track. The race was attended by 35,000 people and all three major radio networks provided live coverage. Whirlaway entered the $25,000 match race a 3 to 10 favorite, while Alsab went off at 8 to 5.

Alsab jumped out to an early lead, holding as much as a two and a half length lead at one point. Whirlaway twice tried to move ahead of Alsab (once as they neared the far turn and once as the two horses entered the backstretch). However, both times jockey Carroll Bierman let Alsab stay ahead. Halfway through the stretch turn, jockey George Woolf turned Whirlway loose. Whirlway's late charge resulted in a photo finish, however Alsab won the race by a nose. The race is considered to be one of the greatest in New England racing history.

Later years
The track began a slow decline in the 1950s. On October 9, 1960, two of the track's barns burned down. Ten horses were killed and the damages were estimated to be between $350,000 and $500,000. Many horses fled the barns and ran into neighboring yards and streets. By the 1970s the track had fallen upon hard times. Due to reduced public interest in thoroughbred racing, competition for racing dates with other New England tracks, and competition from greyhound racing and state lotteries for gambling dollars, attendance dropped and handles decreased rapidly. This led to an inability to attract high-quality horses. The physical condition of the track deteriorated as well. On March 23, 1976, 36 horses died when a fire spread from the hay barn to two adjacent stables. On Labor Day 1978, the final day of the racing season, the track drew only 2,882 patrons.

On September 2, 1977, The Beach Boys performed at Narragansett Park before an audience of 40,000, which remains the largest concert audience in Rhode Island history. In 2017, music historians Al Gomes and Connie Watrous of Big Noise were successful in getting the stretch of street where the concert stage stood (the corner of 455 Narragansett Park Drive) renamed as 'Beach Boys Way.'

Closure
On June 29, 1979, the stockholders of Narragansett Park voted to sell the track to the City of Pawtucket for $5.6 million. The city used a grant from the United States Department of Housing and Urban Development to buy and improve the land, which they sold to developers below market value to stimulate employment and business investment.

On May 30, 1981, the clubhouse was destroyed by a suspicious fire. The only remaining part of the track is part of the grandstand wall, which was the location of the Narragansett Flea Market and later a Building 19 store.

Record holders

References

Narragansett Park
Defunct horse racing venues in Rhode Island
Sports venues in Rhode Island
1934 establishments in Rhode Island
1978 disestablishments in Rhode Island
Buildings and structures in Pawtucket, Rhode Island
Sports in Rhode Island